Shinsekai: Into the Depths is an adventure game developed and published by Capcom for Apple Arcade and the Nintendo Switch.

Gameplay
Shinsekai: Into the Depths is a two-dimensional side-scrolling, adventure game taking place in three-dimensional scenes. The player character works his way through a series of underwater environments, each containing a mix of puzzle and combat encounters. To overcome these challenges, the player has access to several tools and mechanics.

Reception

The iOS version of the game received generally favorable reviews, according to review aggregator Metacritic. According to TechSpot, it was one of Apple Arcade's launch titles and one of the best game on the service. According to Destructoid, although the game has faults, they strongly recommend playing it.

References

External links
 

2019 video games
Adventure games
Apple Arcade games
Capcom games
iOS games
Nintendo Switch games
Side-scrolling video games
Video games developed in Japan
Video games with underwater settings